Argonaut High School is located in Jackson, California in Amador County.  It has about 475 students in grades 9–12. Previously known as Jackson High School, the school merged with Ione High School in 1983 to become Argonaut High School, named after the Argonaut Mine just a 1/2 mile off campus.

Academics
Argonaut High received the coveted California Distinguished School award. While participation in AP programs runs about 40%, it is estimated that college readiness of students runs around 26.9%.

Staff
As of June 25, 2015, Kelly Hunkins, the former principal of Pine Grove Elementary, replaced Dave Vicari as principal of Argonaut High School.  Vicari now serves as Personnel Director for the Amador County Unified School District.

Athletics

Argonaut High School is home of the Mustangs, and they participate in the Mother Lode League. They are well known for their exceptional football program under former Head Coach Rick Davis from 2001 to 2021. Argonaut/Jackson began its football program in 1922 and has won fourteen Mother Lode League Championships (41, 45, 52, 53, 57, 65, 66, 70, 84, 03, 08, 10, 11, 12).  Argonaut shares a heated rivalry with the Amador High School Buffaloes. Argonaut and Amador play in a football game for the "Rotary Bell" called the "Big Game," an event that the county continues to come watch since its inception in 1923.  Sutter/Amador High holds the overall series edge with 56 wins to Jackson/Argonaut's 39 with nine ties.  Since the inception of Argonaut High in 1983, the Big Game between Argonaut and Amador is very close with Argonaut at 20 wins and Amador at 19.  Argonaut won the 2021 game 43-0.  Argonaut won 10 straight games in the series from 2003 to 2012.  Argonaut currently plays its home games at Dan Barnett Field on the western edge of campus.  The first game played at Dan Barnett Field was on Sep 16, 1989 vs Upper Lake High School.  Argonaut is the only MLL team to have won two Sac-Joaquin Section football championships as well as a California state title.  Argonaut won the Div IV championship in 2004 beating Linden 17-0 and the Div VI championship in 2021 beating Rosemont 31-20.  Argonaut football won the Division 6AA Northern California Title on December 3rd, 2021 by beating St. Vincent de Paul (Petaluma) 42-12 in Jackson.  This was only the 2nd ever NorCal football title won by an MLL school.  Argonaut defeated Quartz Hill 47-14 on December 11, 2021 for the California 6AA State Title.  Coach Rick Davis retired at the end of the 2021 season.  Argonaut announced that Jackson alumni and for Los Angeles Raider, Vance Mueller will replace Rick Davis as the Mustangs new head coach. 

Jackson High won the MLL Boys Basketball title in 48, 50, 53, 54, 61, 65, 66, and 74.  Ione won the MLL title in 1960.  Argonaut won MLL titles in 90, 96, 98, 99, and 06.  Argonaut reached the Sac-Joaquin Section Finals in 1998 and 2006 in Division IV as well as in Division V in 2017 and 2019.  The 2018 Argonaut Boys won the Sac-Joaquin Section Division V championship as well as the Northern California championship.  The team lost in the state championship game.

The Argonaut Girls Basketball team has done very well since 2009 winning six MLL titles (09, 10, 13, 15, 18, 20).  The team has also done very well at the sectional level.  They were section runners up in 2010 (Div IV), 2016 (Div V), and 2018 (Div V).  They won the Sac-Joaquin Section title in 2017 (Div V), 2019 (Div V), and 2020 (Div IV).  The Argonaut Girls have reached the section finals five straight years (2016-2020) and a total of six times.  The 2022 team made it to the Nor-Cal championship game falling the Brandon. 

The Argonaut Girls Softball team has won the MLL title four times (94, 98, 11, 12).  They have also captured two Sac-Joaquin Section titles.  In 1998 they were the Div III champs and in 2017 they were the Div VI champs.  

The Jackson High Baseball team captured seven MLL titles coming in 45, 51, 54, 56, 59, 60, and 67.  Ione won titles in 36 and 41.  Argonaut has won six MLL titles in 85, 90, 92, 99, 2016 and 2019.  Argonaut won the Division III Sac-Joaquin Section Title in 1990 and 1992.  

Jackson Wrestling won the MLL title in 1970 and won the MLL tournament in 1970, 1971, and 1972.

The Jackson/Argonaut Tennis team has done exceptionally well over the years winning 44 MLL titles, by far the most titles by any Jackson/Argonaut team.  Jackson won tennis titles in 46, 48, 49, 50, 51, 52, 53, 54, 55, 56, 57, 58, 59, 60, 61, 62, 63, 66, 67, 69, 70, 72, 73, 74, 75, 78, 79, 80, 81, 82, 83.  Argonaut won titles in 84, 88, 01, 02, 03, 04, 05, 10, 11, 12, 13, 16, and 22.  The 2022 Argonaut tennis team won the Sac—Joaquin Section D2 Co-Ed team title to become the first MLL team to win a section title in tennis.

The Jackson Boys Track and Field team won MLL titles in 1942, 1954, 1955, and 1965.  The Ione boys won the MLL title in 1935 and 1936.  The 2012 Argonaut Boys team won the Sac-Joaquin Section title.  

Argonaut (Jackson) High has participated in the Mother Lode League since 1929.  Schools in the MLL include current members Amador (Sutter), Bret Harte, Calaveras, Sonora, and Summerville.  Other schools that have formerly participated in the MLL are Ione, Linden, Brookside Christian, El Dorado, and Lincoln of Stockton.

Argonaut won its first Sac-Joaquin section title in 1990 in Division III baseball under the coaching of Dave Gonzales and won the title again in 1992.  Since then, the Mustangs have won section titles in Softball (98, 17), Football (04, 21), Boys Track (12), Girls Soccer (16), Girls Basketball (17, 19, 20), and Boys Basketball (18), as well as the 2018 Northern California Division V Boys Basketball title, and Co-Ed Tennis (22).

Band
The Argonaut High School band has performed in many local events, such as parades and fundraisers, and in school activities including rallies and football games.  The Argonaut band visits and plays at Disneyland every two years, as well as at the Forum Music Festival in the Bay Area.  Every year, the band performs during winter and spring concerts, including in a community concert located at Amador High School formally called the "Amador Music Festival" or informally as "Mega Band," where Argonaut combines with other school bands in the county.

History
The current Argonaut High School originally opened as Jackson High School in January 1912.  Jackson High's main school building is the Spanish style building currently occupied by the Amador County Unified School District at 217 Rex Ave.  The rest of the school includes the site of current Jackson Junior High to include the gym and football/baseball field.  Jackson High School's mascot was the Tigers and the school colors were Green and White.  Jackson High was relocated to its current location, opening in September 1976.  In 1983, the ACUSD decided to close Ione High School and merge Jackson and Ione together.  The Ione campus would be shut down and its students moved to Jackson.  Upon the move, the ACUSD decided to change the schools name to Argonaut, against the wishes of the students who voted to name the school Jackson-Ione High.  It was decided that the new Argonaut would maintain the mascot of Ione High, the Mustangs, and the colors of Jackson, green, white, and yellow.

Notable alumni
 Ernie "Tiny" Bonham - Ione High 1932 - MLB baseball player, New York Yankees & Pittsburgh Pirates (1940-49).  World Series Champion 1941 and 1943.  MLB All-Star 1942 and 1943.  
 Vance Mueller - Jackson High 1982 - NFL football player Los Angeles Raiders 1986-1991 and current head football coach

References

External links

Maxpreps.com - Argonaut Mustang Football

Public high schools in California
Schools in Amador County, California
1912 establishments in California